John D. Mangum (c. 1859 – 22 December 1918) was a Michigan politician and chairman of the Michigan Republican Party from 1916 to 1918.

He and his family resided in Marquette, Michigan. He was Chairman of the Michigan Republican Party 1916–18.

References 
 http://politicalgraveyard.com/bio/malster-manly.html#MANGUM

Year of birth uncertain
1918 deaths
Michigan Republican Party chairs
Michigan Republicans
People from Marquette, Michigan